Nils Olof Henriksson (born 31 July 1928) is a Finnish cyclist. He won the Finnish national road race title in 1952. He also competed in the 4,000 metres team pursuit event at the 1952 Summer Olympics.

References

External links
 

1928 births
Possibly living people
Finnish male cyclists
Olympic cyclists of Finland
Cyclists at the 1952 Summer Olympics
People from Porvoo
Sportspeople from Uusimaa